Santa's workshop is the workshop at the North Pole.

Santa's workshop may also refer to:

 Santa's Workshop (film), a 1932 animated short by Disney
 Santa's Workshop (New York amusement park) in Wilmington, New York
 Santa's Workshop (Colorado amusement park) in Cascade, Colorado